Results from Norwegian football in 1937.

Class A of local association leagues
Class A of local association leagues (kretsserier) is the predecessor of a national league competition. In 1937, the leagues were shortened, or not even played because of Norgesserien 1937/38.

Norwegian Cup

Final

Northern Norwegian Cup

Final

National team

Sources:

References

 
Seasons in Norwegian football